Stephen John Dillane (born 27 March 1957) is a British actor. He is best known for his roles as Leonard Woolf in the 2002 film The Hours, Stannis Baratheon in Game of Thrones, and Thomas Jefferson in the 2008 HBO miniseries John Adams, a part which earned him a Primetime Emmy nomination. An experienced stage actor who has been called an "actor's actor", Dillane won a Tony Award for his lead performance in Tom Stoppard's play The Real Thing (2000) and gave critically acclaimed performances in Angels in America (1993), Hamlet (1990), and a one-man Macbeth (2005). His television work has additionally garnered him BAFTA and International Emmy Awards for best actor.

Early life
Dillane was born in Kensington, London, to an English mother, Bridget (née Curwen), and an Australian surgeon father, John Dillane. The eldest of his siblings (his younger brother Richard is also an actor), he grew up in West Wickham, Kent.

At school, Dillane began performing in end-of-term plays and had "a certain facility" for funny accents. He often found himself in women's roles, which he says "wasn’t good for my confused adolescent psyche", but also recalls a part in Rosencrantz and Guildenstern Are Dead as being particularly memorable, noting that shouting "Fire!" as Rosencrantz while pointing at the audience was "a very thrilling thing to be able to do."

He studied history and politics at the University of Exeter, concentrating on the Russian Revolution, and afterward became a journalist for the Croydon Advertiser. Unhappy in his career, he read one day how actor Trevor Eve gave up architecture for acting; this, along with reading Hamlet and Peter Brook's The Empty Space back-to-back, made him "light up inside somewhere" and spurred him to enter the Bristol Old Vic Theatre School at 25. During his early acting career, he was known as Stephen Dillon but reverted to his birth name in the 1990s.

Career

Dillane is an experienced theatre actor; his notable roles include Archer in The Beaux' Stratagem (Royal National Theatre, 1989), Prior Walter in Angels in America (1993), Hamlet (1994), Clov in Samuel Beckett's Endgame (1996), Uncle Vanya (1998), Henry in Tom Stoppard's The Real Thing (for which he won a Tony Award in 2000), The Coast of Utopia (2002), and a one-man version of Macbeth (2005) directed by Travis Preston. He has also performed T.S. Eliot's Four Quartets in London and New York City, and was seen in the 2010 Bridge Project's productions of The Tempest and As You Like It.

Dillane also portrayed Horatio in the 1990 film adaptation of Hamlet. He played Michael Henderson in Welcome to Sarajevo (1997), a character based on British journalist Michael Nicholson, and the impatient and easily agitated Harker in Spy Game (2001).

Dillane is also known for his portrayal of Leonard Woolf in The Hours (2002), legendary English professional golfer Harry Vardon in The Greatest Game Ever Played (2005) and Glen Foy in the Goal! trilogy. He also starred in John Adams as Thomas Jefferson.

He joined the cast of Game of Thrones in 2011 as Stannis Baratheon, a major contender for the throne of the fictional realm of Westeros. While admitting he had not read the books on which the series is based, he commented that the show's appeal was due to "the storytelling, the extraordinary world that’s created and the way it reflects our actual world – a naked, ruthless pursuit of power in all its forms."

In 2012, he also played Rupert Keel, head of the private security agency Byzantium, in the BBC drama series Hunted. The following year he went on to take the male lead, opposite Clémence Poésy, in the crime drama series The Tunnel, an Anglo-French remake of the Scandinavian The Bridge. Dillane, who had not seen the original series, plays Karl Roebuck, the laid-back, experienced British detective to Poésy's humourless French counterpart. His performance won him an International Emmy Award for Best Actor. In a second series in 2016, titled The Tunnel: Sabotage, he reprised his role alongside Poésy for a new case involving a deadly airliner crash in the English Channel.

Besides television, Dillane also starred in the 2012 British independent film Papadopoulos & Sons as successful entrepreneur Harry Papadopoulos, who rediscovers his life after being forced to start again from nothing in the wake of a banking crisis. His son, Frank Dillane, plays his son in the film. That same year he also had roles in the films Zero Dark Thirty and Twenty8k.

Offscreen, the actor in 2014 collaborated with visual artist Tacita Dean for the Sydney Biennale and Carriageworks in a project called Event for a Stage. The work, performed live and later adapted for radio broadcast and film, explored the process of filmmaking and the "concept of artifice on the stage" through a single actor, Dillane. The performance encompassed readings from texts as well as his personal reflections on acting, theatre, and family. 2015 saw Dillane making other brief returns to stage including a reprise of his reading of Four Quartets in London and a one-off appearance in Tim Crouch's An Oak Tree at the National Theatre.

In 2016, besides appearing in the second series of The Tunnel, Dillane returned to the Donmar Warehouse for a revival of Brian Friel's Faith Healer. His performance as Frank, an itinerant Irish healer, was described as "poetic and powerful." In addition, he appeared as artist Graham Sutherland in The Crown, Netflix's TV series about British monarch Elizabeth II. In 2017, Dillane appeared in two biopics, playing Edward Wood, 1st Earl of Halifax in Joe Wright's Darkest Hour, starring Gary Oldman as Winston Churchill, and writer William Godwin, the father of Frankenstein author Mary Shelley, in the film Mary Shelley.

In 2018, he shot the film The Thin Man, which has since been retitled The Man In The Hat, opposite Ciarán Hinds; it was directed by Oscar-winning composer Stephen Warbeck. 

Personal life
Dillane has two sons with actress-director Naomi Wirthner: Séamus and actor Frank Dillane, with whom he co-starred in Papadopoulos & Sons''.

Filmography

Film

Television

Stage (select work)

Awards and nominations

References

External links

RealAudio Interview for Macbeth

1957 births
AACTA Award winners
Alumni of Bristol Old Vic Theatre School
Alumni of the University of Exeter
Best Actor BAFTA Award (television) winners
Drama Desk Award winners
International Emmy Award for Best Actor winners
English male film actors
English people of Australian descent
English male stage actors
English male television actors
English male voice actors
Living people
People from West Wickham
Royal Shakespeare Company members
English male Shakespearean actors
Tony Award winners
People from Kensington
Male actors from London
20th-century English male actors
21st-century English male actors
Male actors from Kent
Theatre World Award winners